Moses Barnett (born 3 December 1990) is an English footballer who played in the Football League for Darlington. He started his career at Everton but was released from the club in 2010. He plays as a defender, his preferred position being at left back but also able to play on the right. He currently plays for Denbigh Town.

Club career
Barnett started as a youth team player with Arsenal before joining Everton near the end of the 2006–07 season. He signed on loan for Darlington on 9 October 2009, making his debut the next day in a 2–0 away defeat to Dagenham & Redbridge.

He joined Welsh Premier League club Aberystwyth Town and played only nine games, before signing for Burscough on 5 November 2011 for the rest of the 2011–12 season.

In 2019 he signed for Conwy Borough before moving later in the year to Denbigh Town.

References

External links
 

1990 births
Living people
Association football defenders
Sierra Leone Creole people
Sierra Leonean footballers
English footballers
England youth international footballers
Arsenal F.C. players
Everton F.C. players
Darlington F.C. players
English Football League players
Aberystwyth Town F.C. players
Burscough F.C. players
Northern Premier League players
Denbigh Town F.C. players
Conwy Borough F.C. players